Poshtkuh Rural District is in the Central District of Ardal County, Chaharmahal and Bakhtiari province, Iran. At the census of 2006, its population was 20,878 in 4,468 households; there were 21,395 inhabitants in 5,442 households at the following census of 2011; and in the most recent census of 2016, the population of the rural district was 10,933 in 3,083 households. The largest of its 24 villages was Alikuh, with 2,206 people.

References 

Ardal County

Rural Districts of Chaharmahal and Bakhtiari Province

Populated places in Chaharmahal and Bakhtiari Province

Populated places in Ardal County